The following radio stations broadcast on AM frequency 1520 kHz: 1520 AM is a United States clear-channel frequency. WWKB in Buffalo, New York, and KOKC in Oklahoma City share Class A status on 1520 AM.

Argentina
 LRI721 in Chascomús, Buenos Aires
 LT38 in Gualeguay, Entre Rios
 La Voz del Sur in Luis Guillon, Buenos Aires
 Norteña in Los Polvorines, Buenos Aires

Mexico
 XEEH-AM in San Luis Río Colorado, Sonora

United States
Stations in bold are clear-channel stations.

References

Lists of radio stations by frequency